The Appling County Courthouse, located in Baxley, Georgia, USA, was built in 1907–1908 at a cost of $50,000. It is in the Neoclassical style and is constructed of limestone and concrete. The interior is a cross pattern with four entrances.

It was added to the National Register of Historic Places in 1980.

References

External links

Courthouses on the National Register of Historic Places in Georgia (U.S. state)
National Register of Historic Places in Appling County, Georgia
Neoclassical architecture in Georgia (U.S. state)
Government buildings completed in 1907
Buildings and structures in Appling County, Georgia